Shadow of a Man is a 1955 British crime film directed by Michael McCarthy and starring Paul Carpenter, Rona Anderson and Jane Griffiths.

Premise
After a brawl in a nightclub a man is found dead at his home the following morning.

American hero an old friend of the deceased finds his old chum wasn't quite what he thought...

Cast
 Paul Carpenter as Gene Landers 
 Rona Anderson as Linda Bryant 
 Jane Griffiths as Carol Seaton 
 Tony Quinn as Inspector Gates 
 Ronald Leigh-Hunt as Norman Farrel 
 Bill Nagy as Paul Bryant 
 Jack Taylor as Sergeant McBride 
 Robert O'Neil as Max 
 Diana Chesney as Mrs Carter 
 Rose Alba as Cabaret Singer

References

External links

1955 films
1955 crime films
Films directed by Michael McCarthy
British crime films
1950s English-language films
1950s British films
British black-and-white films